Koonya is a rural locality in the local government area (LGA) of Tasman in the South-east LGA region of Tasmania. The 2016 census has a population of 134 for the state suburb of Koonya.
It hosts the annual Koonya Garlic Festival, a "one-day celebration".

History 
The area was formerly known as Cascades, but had been changed by 1888. Koonya was gazetted as a locality in 1968. The name is believed to be an Aboriginal word, but the meaning is disputed.

It was established in 1841 as one of outlying parts of the network of penal colony sites centered on Port Arthur. 
Under its former name of "Cascades", it was populated by at least 400 convicts.

After the Port Arthur penal colony was closed, and Van Diemen's Land was renamed "Tasmania", a number of places in Tasmania were renamed; "Cascades" was renamed "Koonya".

Geography
The waters of Norfolk Bay form most of the northern boundary.

A weather radar for the City of Hobart is in the Koonya locality.

Road infrastructure 
Route B37 (Nubeena Road) enters from the north-east and runs through to the north-west, where it exits. Route C343 (Nubeena Back Road) starts at an intersection with B37 and runs south-west until it exits.

References

Populated places established in 1841
Convictism in Tasmania
Localities of Tasman Council
Towns in Tasmania
1841 establishments in Australia